The Holbein-Gymnasium is a natural scientific technological and lingual Gymnasium in Augsburg. It is located in Downtown Augsburg, and partly in the Old Town of Augsburg. Around 1,460 students are currently enrolled, being taught by approximately 130 teachers, which makes it the biggest of ten gymnasiums available in Augsburg. It was founded in 1833, and used as a secondary modern school in 1877.

References

Schools in Bavaria
Buildings and structures in Augsburg
1833 establishments in Bavaria
Educational institutions established in 1833